Art Haywood III is an American politician from Pennsylvania currently serving as a member of the Pennsylvania State Senate for the 4th district. A Democrat, he also is the current president of the advocacy group Americans for Democratic Action. Prior to being elected to the State Senate in the 2014 election, Haywood practiced law and served as a commissioner in Cheltenham Township, Pennsylvania.

Biography 
State Senator Art Haywood represents the fourth senate district in Pennsylvania which covers Chestnut Hill, Mt. Airy, Germantown, West Oak Lane, Cheltenham, Springfield, Jenkintown, Rockledge and Abington neighborhoods.  In the Capitol, since 2015, he has been leading legislation to increase retirement savings with a state management auto-IRA and increasing the use of clean energy by electric companies to 30% by 2030. He is a leading advocate for raising the minimum wage, negotiating and successfully advocating for increased wages for CVS employees in 2018.  He has also been a leading advocate for gun violence prevention since 2015, hosting the first Gun Violence Awareness Day in the Capitol and serving as a current member of Moms Demand Action.

In 2018, he led the passage of SB919 which provides emergency transfers to survivors of domestic and sexual violence who live in public housing, and a change to the PA School Code to require lead testing of water in public schools statewide or a public hearing.  Most recently, he worked with the Department of Aging to save taxpayers $2.4 million for the prescription drug program PACE over two years.

He initiated a Mentoring Collaborative with the Urban Affairs Coalition to expand mentoring organizations with youth and brought more than $18 million in state grants for employment and neighborhood improvement.  In the 4th District, Art and his staff have served more than 8,000 neighbors through constituent services and outreach events.

Art Haywood was raised by his mother, an educator who instilled within him hard work and the value of an education. He attended public schools and graduated from Morehouse College, the London School of Economics and Political Science as a Marshall Scholar, and the University of Michigan Law School. His legal career has concentrated on preserving and creating affordable housing and neighborhood revitalization.

Art has three adult children and resides in Wyncote with his wife, Julie Haywood.  They have been married for 29 years.

Political views

Public education 
According to the state Senator's campaign website, "low levels of state funding puts a greater burden on local taxes."

Minimum wage 
Haywood argued that "everyone who's able to work, should work, and receive a decent wage for that work. Without proper wages, parents are less able to provide for their children. Raising wages not only benefits families, businesses also benefit from greater consumer spending." Poverty pay must be ended in the Commonwealth. Every hardworking individual deserves a living wage and Senator Haywood has been fighting since his time in the state legislature to raise the minimum wage in PA.

Gun laws 
Also during the 2014 campaign, based upon the number of gun-related deaths in Pennsylvania from 2001 to 2010, he proposed "restricting access to guns. "

References

External links 
Art Haywood for State Senate campaign website

 http://www.senatorhaywood.com/

African-American state legislators in Pennsylvania
Living people
People from Cheltenham, Pennsylvania
Democratic Party Pennsylvania state senators
Marshall Scholars
University of Michigan Law School alumni
1957 births
21st-century African-American politicians
20th-century African-American people
Politicians from Philadelphia
Politicians from Montgomery County, Pennsylvania